Nicholas Joseph Wasylik (October 2, 1916 – December 4, 2004) was an American football and baseball player and coach. He served as the head football coach at Lake Forest College in Lake Forest, Illinois from 1958 and 1965, compiling a record of 21–39–2, and as the school's head baseball coach from 1972 to 1976.

Head coaching record

College football

References

External links
 

1916 births
2004 deaths
American football quarterbacks
Baltimore Colts coaches
Colgate Raiders football coaches
Lake Forest Foresters athletic directors
Lake Forest Foresters baseball coaches
Lake Forest Foresters football coaches
Miami Seahawks coaches
Ohio State Buckeyes baseball players
Ohio State Buckeyes football players
High school football coaches in Ohio
Sportspeople from Queens, New York
Players of American football from New York City
Baseball players from New York City